Peter Krečič (born 1947) is a Slovenian historian of art and architecture. He is a specialist on the life and work of architect Jože Plečnik, and has published numerous books on this topic, including Plecnik:The Complete Works and Plecnik's Ljubljana. He is the father of the writer Jela Krečič.

References

1947 births
Living people
Slovenian art historians
Slovenian critics
Slovenian male writers
20th-century male writers
Architecture critics
Date of birth missing (living people)